Adama Sanogo (born 12 February 2002) is a Malian college basketball player for the UConn Huskies of the Big East Conference.

Early life and high school career
Sanogo grew up in Bamako, Mali and first played soccer before switching to basketball in 2014. He moved to the United States to play for Our Savior New American School in Centereach, New York. Sanogo transferred to The Patrick School in Hillside, New Jersey due to a coaching change at his previous school. In his senior season, he averaged 13.3 points and 10.5 rebounds per game. Sanogo competed for the New York Rens on the Amateur Athletic Union circuit. A consensus four-star recruit, he committed to playing college basketball for UConn over offers from Seton Hall and Nebraska.

College career
Sanogo became a starter in the third game of his freshman season at UConn. On 3 March 2021, he recorded a season-high 16 points, nine rebounds and two blocks in a 69–58 win over Seton Hall. As a freshman, Sanogo averaged 7.3 points and 4.8 rebounds per game, earning Big East All-Freshman Team honors. On November 24, 2021, he scored a career-high 30 points in a 115–109 double overtime win against Auburn. On December 1, Sanogo suffered an abdominal injury during a 72–63 win versus Maryland Eastern Shore Hawks and was ruled out for several weeks. He was named to the First Team All-Big East.

National team career
Sanogo won a gold medal representing Mali at the 2017 FIBA Under-16 African Championship in Mauritius, averaging 10.5 points and eight rebounds per game. At the 2018 FIBA Under-17 World Cup, he averaged six points and seven rebounds per game.

Career statistics

College

|-
| style="text-align:left;"| 2020–21
| style="text-align:left;"| UConn
| 23 || 20 || 17.0 || .554 || – || .577 || 4.8 || .6 || .4 || .9 || 7.3
|-
| style="text-align:left;"| 2021–22
| style="text-align:left;"| UConn
| 29 || 28 || 29.2 || .504 || .0 || .686 || 8.8 || 1.0 || .9 || 1.9 || 14.8
|-
| style="text-align:left;"| 2022–23
| style="text-align:left;"| UConn
| 33 || 33 || 26.6 || .594 || .354 || .781 || 7.3 || 1.3 || .8 || 0.7 || 16.8
|- class="sortbottom"
| style="text-align:center;" colspan="2"| Career
| 85 || 81 || 24.9 || .551 || .347 || .717 || 7.1 || 1.0 || .7 || 1.2 || 13.5

References

External links
UConn Huskies bio

2002 births
Living people
21st-century Malian people
Malian expatriate sportspeople in the United States
Malian men's basketball players
Power forwards (basketball)
Sportspeople from Bamako
The Patrick School alumni
UConn Huskies men's basketball players